The Roberto Clemente Bridge, also known as the Sixth Street Bridge, spans the Allegheny River in downtown Pittsburgh, Pennsylvania, United States.

History

First bridge
The original bridge at the site was a wooden covered bridge with six spans, probably using Burr trusses. It was built in 1819 by a contractor named Lothrop.

Second bridge

In 1859, the second Sixth Street Bridge was built by John A. Roebling. This was his third and final bridge in Pittsburgh. His eldest son Washington Roebling worked with him on the bridge after completing his degree in engineering. 

The floors were suspended from wire hangers, which were suspended from wire catenaries. This bridge was demolished in 1892, as it was too narrow and fragile to support modern transportation demands.

Third bridge
In 1892, the third Sixth Street Bridge was built by engineer Theodore Cooper for the Union Bridge Company. The spans were twice as wide as the previous bridge. 

In 1927 the bridge had to be taken apart because the steelwork was too brittle for safety. That year, the main spans were somewhat trimmed down temporarily from their  height. They were lowered onto barges and floated down the Ohio River to the back channel of Neville Island, where they were used as part of the Coraopolis Bridge. Finally in 1994 the steel was scrapped.

Current bridge
The current bridge was completed on September 29, 1928. It is one of the ‘Three Sisters’ bridges, which include the 7th and 9th Street bridges. The three bridges are nearly identical self-anchored, eye-bar suspension type. The horizontal pull of the top cords is resisted by the steel girders along each side of the roadway. The suspension system consists of 14" eye-bars extending from end to end, having two pins on the top of each tower and carrying the roadway by 4" eye-bar suspenders at the panel points. The stiffening system consists of triple web-plate girders placed parallel to the road grade. The girders are subjected to stresses due to bending combined with direct compression. 

All three bridges were fabricated and erected by American Bridge (AB). In an innovative approach, AB turned the eye-bar catenary/deck girder system temporarily into a truss by adding a diagonal to enable erection by balance cantilever. This avoided falsework in the river.

The bridge was later formally named the Roberto Clemente Bridge after baseball legend Roberto Clemente, who played his entire career with the Pittsburgh Pirates.

Significance
Named for the Pittsburgh Pirates baseball player Roberto Clemente, it is one of three parallel bridges called The Three Sisters. The Three Sisters are self-anchored suspension bridges and are significant because they are the only trio of nearly identical bridges—as well as the first self-anchored suspension spans—built in the United States. Over 720 bridges link the city districts.

The Sixth Street Bridge's piers were built with arched openings beneath the river bed in order to accommodate future subway tunnels, following the recommendation of transportation planner Bion J. Arnold. The North Shore Connector tunnels completed in 2012 did not make use of this provision, but were bored further west (downstream) and do not pass beneath the bridge.

The bridge was renamed on August 6, 1998, as part of a compromise after the Pirates sold the naming rights to PNC Park to locally based PNC Financial Services. Before the naming rights were sold, there was hugely popular sentiment in Pittsburgh to name the park itself after Clemente.

It is closed to vehicular traffic on Pirates' and Steelers' game days, providing a pedestrian route to PNC Park and Heinz Field. When PNC Park was built, a statue of Roberto Clemente, originally erected at Three Rivers Stadium, was placed at the southeast corner of the park, right at the north anchorage of the Roberto Clemente Bridge.

The Pittsburgh History and Landmarks Foundation in cooperation with the Riverlife Task Force, the City of Pittsburgh, and Duquesne Light Company, funded and managed the architectural lighting of the bridge. On November 20, 2002, the bridge was lit for the first time.

See also
List of bridges documented by the Historic American Engineering Record in Pennsylvania
List of crossings of the Allegheny River

References

Johanna A. Pro (1999). Clemente Bridge Dedication: Pittsburgh Post-Gazette. Retrieved April 23, 2006.

External links

entry at pghbridges.com
entry at BridgeMeister.com
Winter Pictures of the Roberto Clemente Bridge Kyle Yates Photography

Clemente
Bridges completed in 1928
Bridges over the Allegheny River
Road bridges on the National Register of Historic Places in Pennsylvania
Pittsburgh History & Landmarks Foundation Historic Landmarks
Suspension bridges in Pennsylvania
Self-anchored suspension bridges
Historic American Engineering Record in Pennsylvania
National Register of Historic Places in Pittsburgh
Steel bridges in the United States